The Nashua Manufacturing Company was a cotton textile manufacturer in Nashua, New Hampshire that operated from 1823 to 1945. It was one of several textile companies that helped create what became the city of Nashua, creating roads, churches and its own bank as part of the process. Like most New England textile mills it struggled during the Depression. It shut after World War II, when much of the industry had moved South for cheaper labor and land.

History

Nashua was one of several towns that was established along the Merrimack River to take advantage of water power in the early days of the Industrial Revolution. The most notable mills were the Merrimack mills (founded 1823) in Lowell, Massachusetts and the Amoskeag mills (founded 1810) at Manchester, New Hampshire, where the Millyard Museum is located.

The Nashua Manufacturing Company was incorporated in 1823 on the initiative of Daniel Abbot. Abbot is considered the "father of Nashua", and he was part of the town when it was renamed from Dunstable, New Hampshire to Nashua in 1837. He and other citizens began the company after buying up land from the banks of the Merrimack along the Nashua River up to Mine Falls, as they planned to use the falls to power their mills. They hired Asher Benjamin to design the mills, including churches and a grid of streets. The company helped fund the digging of the Nashua power canal. After the canal was complete, the company built more mill buildings and hired more labor, likely helping the town's population rise from 1,142 to 2,417 in the years 1820-1830.

In 1835, one of the founders of the company also founded the Nashua Bank, later known as the Indian Head Bank, which used its own currency. The Nashua Manufacturing Company was larger than other mills built during this time and during the 19th and early 20th centuries, bought several other textile manufacturers, including Jackson Company, Indian Head Mills, and Tremont and Suffolk Mills. The company owned the largest contiguous portion of these properties encompassing 400 acres and is now protected as Mine Falls Park and the Nashua Manufacturing Company Historic District.

It was acquired by Textron Inc. in 1945. In 1947, Textron combined the operation of several mills.

Six of the mill buildings along the Nashua River were converted into apartments in the early 2000s and are now known as Clocktower Place Apartments.

References

External links
 Clocktower Place Apartments

Archives and records
Nashua Manufacturing Company records at Baker Library Special Collections, Harvard Business School.

Companies based in Nashua, New Hampshire
History of New Hampshire
Manufacturing companies established in 1823
Textile mills in the United States
Defunct manufacturing companies based in New Hampshire
Manufacturing companies disestablished in 1945
American companies established in 1823
1823 establishments in New Hampshire
1945 disestablishments in New Hampshire
1945 mergers and acquisitions